KGV Park, or simply KGV (King George V) is home to Football Federation Tasmania, the governing body for association football in Tasmania, and home to the Glenorchy Knights football team. It is referred to as the Home of Football in Tasmania.
It is located in the heart of Glenorchy less than 1 kilometre from the Glenorchy CBD, 7 kilometres from Hobart City.

Current use
KGV is home to the Glenorchy Knights football club who play home matches in the NPL Tasmania and lower grades at the ground.

It is also used for all major football matches played in the South of Tasmania, including Statewide Cup Finals and Statewide Finals Series Matches.

In 2010, A-League side Central Coast Mariners played a Tasmanian representative side in front of a crowd of around 2,000 people.

Redevelopment
In December 2012 KGV Park was resurfaced with an artificial turf pitch. The new surface included Poligras synthetic grass and an in situ rubber shock pad was installed by Grassports Australia to FIFA 2 star standard.

References

External links
Soccerway page

Landmarks in Hobart
Sports venues in Hobart
Glenorchy, Tasmania